Ahd Party is a Jordanian political party. The general secretary of the party as of some years ago was Khaldun an-Nasr.

See also
 List of political parties in Jordan

References

External links
Party website

Political parties in Jordan